Stan Smith was the defending champion, but Ilie Năstase defeated him 4–6, 6–1, 3–6, 6–0, 6–2 in the final.

Draw

Finals

Top half

Section 1

Section 2

Bottom half

Section 3

Section 4

External links
 1973 Paris Open draw

Singles